Tõnu Kõiv (born 4 December 1968 in Rakvere) is an Estonian politician. He was a member of IX Riigikogu.

References

Living people
1968 births
Social Democratic Party (Estonia) politicians
Members of the Riigikogu, 1999–2003
People from Rakvere
Members of the Riigikogu, 2003–2007